The 9th Marine Infantry Regiment (9e RIMa) is a infantry regiment of the Troupes de marine in the French Army, currently stationed at French Guiana. The troops are situated in the Cayenne district on the River Maroni, in the town of Saint-Jean-du-Maroni, the site of a former penal colony.

Mission and Organization
9e RIMa has a dual mission of infantry and operational support for French forces in Guiana. The regiment recruits from rural Creole, Bush-country Nengue and Amerindian locations in Guiana, as well as in the neighboring countries of Suriname and Brazil. The regiment has a permanent contingent, consisting mainly of marine troops, but also containing forces from all military branches.  However 70% of its personnel only sign up for short-term missions. It operates in an equatorial environment, creating great physical strain for its members.  Due to its environment, the regiment experts have developed a school to instruct the 1380 short-term mission personnel who serve in its ranks each year, in the tactics specific to the equatorial jungle and river in which it operates.

The infantry has missions along the Maroni and deep into the interior of the country, terminating at the border with Brazil. In the summer of 1999, the infantry was reinforced by a permanent company created specifically for the missions of Operation "Harp". This new company's numbers are estimated to be 670 military personnel.

Structures
The 9e RIMa is composed of several companies stationed in Cayenne, and a detachment based in Saint-Jean-du-Maroni:

 one headquarters company — in the Loubère neighborhood in Cayenne
 one permanent infantry company (created: summer 2010)
 one maintenance company — in the Berthelin Journet district in Cayenne
 one short-mission infantry company
 one short-mission engineering company
 one engineering company
 one reserve company
 one platoon — stationed in Saint-Jean-du-Maroni.

Battles inscribed on the flag
 Creation Date: 1890. Reactivated under its original name in 1992.

It bears the following inscription:

9th Marine Infantry Regiment :

Alma 1854
Palikao 1860
Tonkin 1883
Tombouctou 1890
Tien-tsin 1900
Pékin 1900
Indochine 1939-1945
AFN 1952-1962

Sources and bibliography
 Erwan Bergot, Colonial Rif in Chad 1925-1980, printed in France: December 1982 No. 7576 of editor, n ° 31129 printer, the printing presses Hérissey.

Marines regiments of France
Infantry regiments of France
20th-century regiments of France
21st-century regiments of France
Military units and formations established in 1890